Patrick Wilson (born 1973) is an American actor.

Patrick Wilson may also refer to:

 Patrick Wilson (astronomer) (1743–1811), British astronomer, type-founder, mathematician and meteorologist
 Patrick Wilson (architect) (1798–1871), British architect
 Patrick Wilson (librarian) (1927–2003), American librarian, information scientist and philosopher
 Paddy Wilson (1933–1973), Northern Ireland politician
 Paddy Wilson (footballer) (born 1946), Scottish footballer
 Patrick Wilson (composer), British musician and composer
 Patrick Wilson (drummer) (born 1969), American drummer for the band Weezer
 Patrick Wilson (New Zealand actor)
 Patrick Wilson (footballer) (born 1994), Australian rules footballer for Adelaide

See also
 Pat Wilson (born 1948), Australian female singer